Silvina is a given name. It is a variant of Silvana, meaning "one who lives in the forest".

People with the name
 Silvina Bosco, Argentine actress
 Silvina Bullrich (1915–1990), Argentine writer
 Silvina Chediek (born 1962), Argentine journalist and presenter
 Silvina Corvalán (born 1973), Argentine field hockey player
 Silvina D'Elía (born 1986), Argentine field hockey player

 Silvina Fabars (born 1944), Cuban dancer
 Silvina Luna (born 1980), Argentina model, actress, and vedette
 Silvina Milstein (born 1956), Argentine composer and scholar
 Silvina Montrul, American linguist
 Silvina Moschini (born 1972), Argentine entrepreneur
 Silvina Ocampo (1903–1993), Argentine writer
 Silvina Pereira da Silva (born 1948), Brazilian sprinter
 Silvina Reinaudi (born 1942), Argentine writer
 Silvina Schlesinger (born 1985), Argentine handball player

References

Spanish feminine given names